Carex tapintzensis is a tussock-forming species of perennial sedge in the family Cyperaceae. It is native to eastern parts of Tibet and western parts of China.

See also
List of Carex species

References

tapintzensis
Taxa named by Adrien René Franchet
Plants described in 1895
Flora of China
Flora of Tibet